The Cy-Fair Fire Department provides fire protection and emergency medical services to unincorporated areas of Harris County, Texas. The department primarily serves the communities of Cypress and Fairbanks which are collectively known as Cypress-Fairbanks or Cy-Fair since. Cy-Fair Fire Department serves over 500,000 people over a  area and responds to more than 27,000 incidents each year.

Cy-Fair Fire Department is a combination department utilizing volunteers, full-time and part-time paid crews.  During the standard week; seven to eight engines, one heavy-rescue truck, and two aerial trucks are manned with a combination of volunteer and career staffing in order to provide a timelier response. Cy-Fair's Medic Units are staffed with full-time employees 24 hours a day, year-round.

Stations and Apparatus 
The department has 13 fire stations spread across their response area.

References

External links 

Cy-Fair Fire Department

Fire departments in Texas
Fire